Daniel Jacob Hernandez (born November 20, 1983) is an American film and television writer and producer. He is most notable for writing Pokémon Detective Pikachu, which he co-wrote with his writing partner, Benji Samit (along with Rob Letterman, Derek Connolly, and Nicole Perlman). On television, Hernandez and Samit have written for One Day at a Time, The Tick, Super Fun Night, and 1600 Penn. They were named in Paste Magazine's list of the top 28 comedy writers of 2018. In 2019, Samit and Hernandez signed a long-term deal with 20th Century Fox Television to develop, write and produce animated and live-action series.

Filmography

Film

Television

Reference Links

External links

American television writers
Living people
American producers
1983 births
Place of birth missing (living people)